Tonewood refers to specific wood varieties that possess tonal properties that make them good choices for use in woodwind or acoustic stringed instruments.

Varieties of tonewood
As a rough generalization it can be said that stiff-but-light softwoods (i.e. from coniferous trees) are favored for the soundboards or soundboard-like surface that transmits the vibrations of the strings to the ambient air. Hardwoods (i.e. from deciduous trees) are favored for the body or framing element of an instrument. Woods used for woodwind instruments include African blackwood, (Dalbergia melanoxylon), also known as grenadilla, used in modern clarinets and oboes. Bassoons are usually made of Maple, especially Norway maple (Acer platanoides). Wooden flutes, recorders, and baroque and classical period instruments may be made of various hardwoods, such as pear (Pyrus species), boxwood (Buxus species), or ebony (Diospyros species).

Softwoods
 Spruces are often used in the sound boards of instruments from the lute, violin, oud, mandolin, guitar, and harpsichord families; as well as the piano.  Spruce is particularly suited for this use because of its high stiffness-to-weight ratio. Commonly used varieties are Sitka (or Alaskan) spruce (Picea sitchensis), Adirondack (or red) spruce (Picea rubens), Engelmann spruce (Picea engelmannii), and Picea abies (variously known as Norwegian, German, Alpine, Italian or European spruce).
 Cedars, particularly western red cedar (Thuja plicata, not a true cedar), have since the 1950s been used in the tops of flamenco guitars, classical guitars and to a less degree in steel string acoustic guitars.
 Yew was once widely used for lute bowls.
 Other softwoods, such as redwood and Douglas-fir have been used to a limited degree. Redwood is not used commonly for guitars with steel strings, but has been used for Spanish guitars.

Hardwoods
 Maple is traditionally used for the backs and sides of violin family instruments.  It is also frequently seen in acoustic guitars and mandolins.  Most Fender electric guitars feature maple necks (it is one of the hardest and most stable tonewoods, so it is often used in the neck because of its ability to withstand high string tension). Hard maples is commonly used for wooden tripods for its vibration damping properties. Variations of maple (commonly maple wood with flamed or quilted grains) are used on the tops of electric guitars for aesthetic purposes. The very sturdy frame of the modern piano is usually made of maple or of beech.
 Mahogany may be used in the tops of some guitars as well as the back, sides, and necks of instruments of the mandolin and guitar families. Mahogany may also be used for the solid bodies of electric guitars, such as the Gibson Les Paul.  Due to lack of availability, other similar woods are used as mahogany replacements, such as Australian red cedar (Toona), African mahogany (Khaya), meranti (Lauan), Kauri (Agathis), mora (Nato), and sapele. Some of these alternatives are Mahogany family timbers.
 Rosewoods are often used in the back and/or sides of guitars and mandolins and fretboards on guitars. The most sought-after variety, Brazilian rosewood (Dalbergia nigra) has become scarce and expensive due to severe trade restrictions (embargo and CITES), scarcity and demand. However, in August 2019, CITES announced an exception for rosewood used in musical instruments. The most widely used rosewood used now is East Indian Rosewood, often paired with a spruce top for steel string guitars and with spruce or cedar for classical guitars.
 Koa is traditionally used for ukuleles.  Koa is also used for steel string guitars mostly due to its beauty and compressed dynamic range.
 Ebony is also often used in many types of instruments for fingerboards, tailpieces, tuning pegs, and so forth due to its attractive appearance, smoothness to the touch, hardness and wear resistance.  Several varieties of ebony are used.  Ebony is often dyed to make it appear more uniformly black than the natural wood, which sometimes shows brown streaks.
 Cocobolo used in upper-end clarinets and guitars.
 Paubrasilia, commonly called Pernambuco or Brazilwood, is the most sought-after material for the bows of classical stringed instruments, because of its effects on the tones they produce.
 Blackwood (Tasmanian/Australian).
 Walnut is often used for the backs and sides of guitars and mandolin family instruments.
 Ash, Alder and Basswood are commonly used for the bodies of electric guitars for their stiff properties.

Mechanical properties of tonewoods 
Some of the mechanical properties of common tonewoods, sorted by density.

Carbon-fiber/Epoxy, glass, aluminum, and steel added for comparison, since they are sometimes used in musical instruments.

Density is measured at 12% moisture content of the wood, i.e. air at 70 °F and 65% relative humidity.  Most professional luthiers will build at 8% moisture content (45% relative humidity), and such wood would weigh less on average than that reported here, since it contains less water.

Data comes from the Wood Database, except for 𝜈LR, Poisson's ratio, which comes from the Forest Product Laboratory, United States Forest Service, United States Department of Agriculture. The ratio displayed here is for deformation along the radial axis caused by stress along the longitudinal axis.

The shrink volume percent shown here is the amount of shrinkage in all three dimensions as the wood goes from green to oven-dry. This can be used as a relative indicator of how much the dry wood will change as humidity changes, sometimes referred to as the instrument's "stability". However, the stability of tuning is primarily due to the length-wise shrinkage of the neck, which is typically only about 0.1% to 0.2% green to dry. The volume shrinkage is mostly due to the radial and tangential shrinkage. In the case of a neck (quarter-sawn), the radial shrinkage affects the thickness of the neck, and the tangential shrinkage affects the width of the neck. Given the dimensions involved, this shrinkage should be practically unnoticeable.  The shrinkage of the length of the neck, as a percent, is quite a bit less, but given the dimension, it is enough to affect the pitch of the strings.

The sound radiation coefficient is defined as:

where  is Young’s Modulus of flexure in Pascals (N/m2, i.e. the number in the table multiplied by 109), and ρ is the density in kg/m3, as in the table.

From this, it can be seen that the loudness of the top of a stringed instrument increases with stiffness, and decreases with density. The loudest wood tops, such as Sitka Spruce, are lightweight and stiff, while maintaining the necessary strength. Denser woods, for example Hard Maple, often used for necks, are stronger but not as loud (R = 6 vs. 12).

When wood is used as the top of an acoustic instrument, it can be described using plate theory and plate vibrations. The flexural rigidity of an isotropic plate is:

Plate rigidity has units of Pascal·m3 (equivalent to N·m), since it refers to the moment per unit length per unit of curvature, and not the total moment. Of course, wood is not isotropic, it's orthotropic, so this equation is at best an approximation.

The value for  shown in the table was calculated using this formula and a thickness  of 3.0mm=0.12″.

When wood is used as the neck of an instrument, it can be described using beam theory. Flexural rigidity of a beam (defined as ) varies along the length as a function of x shown in the following equation:

 

Beam flexural rigidity has units of Pascal·m4 (equivalent to N·m²).

The amount of deflection at the end of a cantilevered beam is:

Given two necks of the same shape and dimensions,  becomes a constant, and deflection becomes inversely proportional to —in short, the higher this number for a given wood species, the less a neck will deflect under a given force (i.e. from the strings).

Read more about mechanical properties in Wood for Guitars.

Selection of tonewoods
In addition to perceived differences in acoustic properties, a luthier may use a tonewood because of:

 Availability
 Stability
 Cosmetic properties such as the color or grain of the wood
 Tradition
 Size (Some instruments require large pieces of suitable wood)

Sources
Many tonewoods come from sustainable sources through specialist dealers. Spruce, for example, is very common, but large pieces with even grain represent a small proportion of total supply and can be expensive. Some tonewoods are particularly hard to find on the open market, and small-scale instrument makers often turn to reclamation, for instance from disused salmon traps in Alaska, various old construction in the U.S Pacific Northwest, from trees that have blown down, or from specially permitted removals in conservation areas where logging is not generally permitted. Mass market instrument manufacturers have started using Asian and African woods, such as Bubinga (Guibourtia species) and Wenge (Millettia laurentii), as inexpensive alternatives to traditional tonewoods.

The Fiemme Valley, in the Alps of Northern Italy, has long served as a source of high-quality spruce for musical instruments, dating from the violins of Antonio Stradivari to the piano soundboards of the contemporary maker Fazioli.

Preparation
Tonewood choices vary greatly among different instrument types.  Guitar makers generally favor quartersawn wood because it provides added stiffness and dimensional stability.  Soft woods, like spruce, may be split rather than sawn into boards so the board surface follows the grain as much as possible, thus limiting run-out.

For most applications, wood must be dried before use, either in air or kilns. Some luthiers prefer further seasoning for several years.

Some guitar manufacturers subject the wood to rarefaction, which mimics the natural aging process of tonewoods. Torrefaction is also used for this purpose, but it often changes the cosmetic properties of the wood. Guitar builders using torrefied sound boards claim improved tone, similar to that of an aged instrument. Softwoods such as Spruce, Cedar, and Redwood, which are commonly used for guitar sound boards, are easier to torrefy than hardwoods, such as Maple. 

On inexpensive guitars, it is increasingly common to use a product called "Roseacer" for the fretboard, which mimics Rosewood, but is actually a thermally-modified Maple.

"Roasted" Maple necks are increasingly popular as manufacturers claim increased stiffness and stability in changing conditions (heat and humidity). However, while engineering tests of the ThermoWood method indicated increased resistance to humidity, they also showed a significant reduction in strength (ultimate breaking point), while stiffness (modulus of elasticity) remained the same or was slightly reduced. Although the reduction in strength can be controlled by reducing the temperature of the process, the manufacturer recommends not using its product for structural purposes. However, it is perhaps possible to compensate for this loss of strength in guitars by using carbon-fiber stiffeners in necks and increased bracing in tops.

References

External links

Commercial article on woods used for woodwind instruments
Guitarbench's database of tonewood species
Alan Arnold Interactive Tonewood guide
The Heretics Guide to Tonewoods
More about Guitar Wood
Tonewoods for guitars
Taylor acoustic guitar woods

String instrument construction
Wood